Kingston Avenues may refer to the following stations of the New York City Subway in Brooklyn:

Kingston–Throop Avenues (IND Fulton Street Line), serving the  trains
Kingston Avenue (IRT Eastern Parkway Line), serving the  trains